Addison Railroad may refer to:
Addison Railroad (Vermont), a predecessor of the Rutland Railroad
Addison Railroad (Illinois) (1890-1892), a predecessor of the Illinois Central Railroad